Adhaerenseius is a genus of mites in the family Ascidae.

Species
 Adhaerenseius floralis G. C. Loots & P. D. Theron, 1992

References

Ascidae